Pseudaminic acid cytidylyltransferase (PseF) is an enzyme with systematic name CTP:5,7-diacetamido-3,5,7,9-tetradeoxy-L-glycero-alpha-L-manno-nonulosonic acid cytidylyltransferase. This enzyme catalyses the following chemical reaction

 CTP + 5,7-bis(acetylamino)-3,5,7,9-tetradeoxy-L-glycero-alpha-L-manno-2-nonulopyranosonic acid  diphosphate + CMP-5,7-bis(acetylamino)-3,5,7,9-tetradeoxy-L-glycero-alpha-L-manno-2-nonulopyranosonic acid

Mg2+ is required for activity.

References

External links 
 

EC 2.7.7